Ichangoor is a village in the Hosur taluk of Krishnagiri district, Tamil Nadu, India.In this village 5 temples located

1.Mariyamma temple

2.sree yellama devi temple

3.vishnu temple

4.kaveriyamman temple

5.anjenayar temple

References 

 

Villages in Krishnagiri district